Labyrinth of Lust or  Het Labyrint der Lusten  is a 1991 Dutch drama film directed by Pim de la Parra.

Cast
Peter Barent  ... Bokstrainer
Thea Biermans ... Fotografe
Francesco Crabu ... Taxichauffeur
Berith Danse ... Bokster
Natasja Andre de la Porte ... Autistische vrouw
Cyrus Frisch... Bordeelhouder
Ellis Geeflor ... Schoonmaakster
Aurora Guds ... Bediende
Margot Hakhuis ... Advocate
Curtis Jones... Echtgenoot psychiater
Fulco Lorenzo ... Assistant stadsarchitect
Cindy Marlet ... Hoertje
Dunja Monker ... Hoertje
Hedda Oledzky ... Vriendin Jaqueline
Johan Schulmayer ... Advocate
Jacqueline Spears ... Psychiater
Dela Maria Vaags ... Jaqueline
Lotte van Dam ... Makelaar
Otakar Votocek ... Psychiater
Mingus Weyand ... Bediende

External links 
 

1991 films
1990s Dutch-language films
1991 drama films
Dutch drama films